Ghar Ki Izzat is a 1948Hindi drama film directed by Ram Daryani for Murli Movietone. The film starred Dilip Kumar and Mumtaz Shanti in lead roles with Manorama, Jeevan and Gope. The cinematography was by Kumar Jayawant. Music was composed by Pundit Gobindram. The story writer was K. S. Daryani and the dialogue and lyrics were by I. C. Kapoor.

The milieu is an upper middle-class joint family, with the mother treating her son's wife shabbily. The son, an educated man working as a lawyer, is unable to handle the situation at home and turns to drink.

Plot 
Chandra (Dilip Kumar) a young lawyer, lives in a rich joint family with his parents, sister Radhika (Manorama) and sister's husband, Chaman (Gope). Chaman is made to do all the household chores as he lives on the sustenance provided by his wife's family. When Chaman is repeatedly insulted by his mother-in-law, Radhika steps in and walks out of the house with her husband. They start a small business outside the city and lead a happy life. One of their customers include Roopa (Mumtaz Shanti), who lives a poor lifestyle with her loving older brother Moti (Jeevan) and a younger brother Gulab, studying in school. To make a living, Roopa runs a school

While visiting his sister, Chandra meets Roopa and is captivated by her loving, sincere personality. Chandra and Roopa fall in love and are married despite their financial differences. However, when Chandra's parents learn about Roopa's social status, they insult and taunt her, slowly making her life miserable. Chandra's mother tries to give Roopa's clothes away to the servants, calls her a robber and insults her brothers when they come to visit her. She even locks up Roopa in a room while Chandra is on a trip to Pune!

Chandra tries hard to change his parents' mind, but they don't pay attention to his words and continue oppressing Roopa. Despite Chandra's efforts, Roopa insists that she will listen to whatever her in-laws tell her, as she wants to win their heart with love and respect. A distraught Chandra is sick of the disparity meted out to him and his wife, and leaves home. He takes to drinking and gambling and his life falls apart. Radhika requests her mother to let Roopa out, as she is what Chandra truly needs. In the end, Chaman and Radhika help Chandra and Roopa be reunited again.

Chandra's parents realise their mistake and apologise to their son and daughter-in-law and promise to be loving. His mother tells Roopa that, henceforth, she would treat her like her own daughter. The movie ends on a happy note with everyone enjoying a dance presented by Roopa and Radhika.

The movie also addresses topics such as dowry, social injustice, poverty and relationships in a realistic and convincing manner.

Cast
 Dilip Kumar as Chander 
 Mumtaz Shanti as Roopa
 Manorama as Radhika
 Jeevan as Motilal
 Dixit as Raisaheb Chunnilal
 Suleman as Gulab
 Gulab as Mrs. Chunnilal
 Gope as Chimanlal

Soundtrack
The music was directed by Pandit Gobindram, with lyrics by I. C. Kapoor (Ishwar Chandra Kapoor). The playback singers were Mohammed Rafi, Shamshad Begum, Meena Kapoor, G. M. Durrani, Ram Kamlani and Zohrabai Ambalewali.

Song List

References

1948 films
1940s Hindi-language films
Indian black-and-white films
Indian drama films
1948 drama films
Hindi-language drama films